Northamptonshire Titans B.C. is an English basketball club, based in the town of Wellingborough, Northamptonshire.

History
The club was formed in 2012 following the merger of two local clubs, Wellingborough Phoenix, formed in 1988, and Northampton, a succession of teams who competed in the National Leagues between 1993 and 2009.

 The Titans entered the National Basketball League in 2019, achieving promotion to Division 2 (South) in their inaugural season with a 100% record.

Teams
For the 2020–21 season, the Titans will field the following teams:

Senior Men - National Division 2 South
Senior Men II - National Division 3 Midlands
Senior Women - National Division 2 South
U18 Men - National U18 Premier

U18 Men II - National U18 Conference
U18 Women - National U18 Conference
U16 Boys - National U16 Premier
U16 Boys II - National U16 Conference

U16 Girls - National U16 Conference
U14 Boys - National U14 Premier
U14 Boys II - National U14 Conference
U14 Girls - National U14 Conference

U12 Boys - National U12 Conference
U12 Girls - National U12 Conference
U19 Academy - Academies Basketball League

Foundation
The club also run several community initiatives, including mini basketball and walking basketball.

Notable former players
  Jacob Round
  Samuel Grant

Arena
Weavers Leisure Centre

Season-by-season records

References

Basketball teams in England